Levi Wijk, known professionally as  Bunt (stylized as "BUNT.") is a German DJ. It was formerly a duo composing of him and Nico Crispin from Stuttgart, before Nico leaving in May, 2021. He is signed to Artista Records.

Musical style
Bunt's musical style is described as "electronic folk music" and noted to be heavily influenced by late electronic music pioneer Avicii along with influences from musicians such as Justice, Basement Jaxx, Swedish House Mafia and Calvin Harris. When it was still a duo, BUNT. publicly stated that they are huge fans of Avicii, whom had gave them the inspiration to start creating their style of songs, which mixes electronic music with folk house music, which is something that is still new in the electronic music world. In a fan reply, BUNT. has publicly stated they were happy to be able to complete the song 'Crocodile Tears' as a final tribute to Avicii.

Career
Bunt began to collaborate in 2014 when they were students in college.

In 2016, they released the song "Old Guitar" and "Young Hearts". They are signed to Interscope Management.

In 2019, they released "Oh My Other".

In 2020, they released singles "Unbreakable" featuring Clarence Coffee Jr., "Nights Like That" feat. Georgia Ku and "Crocodile Tears" feat. Jens Hult.

In 2021, Nico left the duo.

In 2023, they released "Clouds" with Artista Records.

BUNT Discography

Singles

Remixes

References

External links

German DJs
Deep house musicians
German electronic music groups
German musical duos
Electronic dance music duos
Folktronica musicians
Musical groups from Stuttgart
Geffen Records artists